Atlanta Athletic Club (AAC), founded in 1898, is a private athletic club in Johns Creek, Georgia, a suburb 23 miles north of Atlanta. The original home of the club was a 10-story building located on Carnegie Way, and in 1904 a golf course was built on Atlanta's East Lake property. In 1908, John Heisman (the Georgia Tech football coach for whom the Heisman Trophy was named) was hired as the AAC athletic director.

While it was downtown, its team placed third in the 1921 Amateur Athletic Union National Basketball Championship defeating Lowe and Campbell Athletic Goods 36–31 in the third place game. At the time colleges, athletic clubs and factory-sponsored clubs all competed in the same league.

In 1967, the AAC sold both properties and moved to a big site in a then-unincorporated area of Fulton County that had a Duluth mailing address and would eventually become Johns Creek in 2006. The vacated East Lake site became East Lake Golf Club and was refurbished during the 1990s.  It is now the home of The Tour Championship, currently the final event of the PGA Tour golf season.

AAC hosted the 1950 U.S. Women's Amateur and 1963 Ryder Cup at East Lake, the 1976 U.S. Open, the 1981, 2001, and 2011 PGA Championships on its Highlands Course, and the 1990 U.S. Women's Open on its Riverside Course. The AAC used both of its current regulation courses to host the 2014 U.S. Amateur, with stroke-play qualifying on the Riverside Course and match play on the Highlands Course. The Riverside course, renovated by Rees Jones in 2002, was recognized among the top 10 new private courses in 2004 by Golf Digest.

AAC has hosted many non-golf events including the first two Southeastern Conference men's basketball tournaments in 1933 and 1934. In 1984 and 1985, AAC hosted the U.S. Open Badminton Championship. During the 1990s, AAC hosted the AT&T Challenge, Atlanta's ATP professional tennis stop.

AAC has two 18-hole golf courses, a health center, indoor and outdoor tennis, a par-3 course, Olympic-sized pool, as well as dining.

Famous members of AAC include golfers Bobby Jones, Charlie Yates, Alexa Stirling, Watts Gunn, Dot Kirby, and Tommy Barnes; football player Daddy Barcomb; tennis player Nat Thornton; and basketball player Bob Kurland.

In the 2004 film Bobby Jones: Stroke of Genius, many of the golf scenes were filmed at AAC.

Pictures

Key dates
1898 – first organizational meeting and granting of club charter
1899 – Official opening of 56 Edgewood Avenue facility
1902 – Move to new clubhouse at 37 Auburn Avenue
1924 – purchase of Carnegie Way property (10 story downtown club)
1926 – opening of Carnegie Way property
1930 – winning of Grand Slam by Bobby Jones Jr.
1963 – purchase of River Bend property in Duluth
1967 – opening of the new 27-hole golf course at River Bend
1968 – vote by stockholders to sell East Lake Country Club
1969 – selection of Atlanta Athletic Club Country Club as name for River Bend club
1971 – decision to sell Carnegie Way town club
1973 – destruction of Carnegie Way town club
2016 – second redesign of Highlands by Rees Jones

Scorecards

Major tournaments hosted

References

External links

Highlands Renovation in Preparation for 2011 PGA Championship
AAC voted #1 Athletic Club

Golf clubs and courses in Georgia (U.S. state)
Golf clubs and courses designed by Tom Bendelow
Tennis venues in the United States
Basketball venues in Georgia (U.S. state)
Tourist attractions in Fulton County, Georgia
Buildings and structures in Fulton County, Georgia
Johns Creek, Georgia
Sports venues completed in 1898
1898 establishments in Georgia (U.S. state)